Batz-sur-Mer (literally Batz on Sea) is a commune in the Loire-Atlantique department in western France.

The commune is situated on a former island that, until around the 9th century, was separate from the mainland at Guérande and the neighboring island of Le Croisic. The territory of the commune is now part of the wild coast of Guérande Peninsula with rocky cliffs, sandy beaches along the Atlantic Ocean, and an extensive salt marshes to the northeast and east.

The town lies between the Bay of Biscay and its salt marshes and is a very Breton town of whitewashed granite houses.

History
In 945, Alan II, Duke of Brittany, founded a priory in Batz-sur-Mer, dedicated to St Winwaloe. Its Benedictine monks developed the local economy, and apart from religion they devoted themselves to agriculture and to the maintenance of salt ponds.

The historic church of Saint-Guénolé, or Winwaloe, largely dating from the 15th century, stands in the town centre. The church contains a 16th-century sculpture of the Madonna and Child, and its 17th-century belfry provides a significant local landmark. Climbing to the top of the tower gives a good view over the salt marshes and the Le Croisic peninsula.

Batz was historically part of the Duchy of Brittany and is very near to the south-eastern limit of the area in which there is evidence of Breton settlement in the early Middle Ages. The town remained part of Brittany until 1957, and the Breton language was still being spoken there as late as the early 20th century.

In 1834, Balzac stayed in the commune, with Laure de Berny, at the Calme Logis of Madame de La Valette. He wrote there Un drame au bord de la mer, which is set in nearby Le Croisic.

The mathematician Pavel Samuilovich Urysohn drowned while swimming there with his colleague Pavel Alexandrov, who was greatly distressed by his failure to save his friend. Urysohn is buried in Batz-sur-Mer.

The Musée des marais salants (or salt ponds museum) was founded in 1887 by Adèle Pichon, a local nun, after she realized that tourism would put an end to the local way of life, and this is now one of the oldest traditional local museums in France. See The works of Jean Fréour Sculptor of woman carrying salt outside this museum.

Population

See also
La Baule - Guérande Peninsula
Communes of the Loire-Atlantique department
Ferdinand du Puigaudeau

References

External links
mairie-batzsurmer.fr - web site of the mayor of Batz-sur-Mer

Communes of Loire-Atlantique
Loire-Atlantique communes articles needing translation from French Wikipedia
Populated coastal places in France